Pipunculidae is a family of flies (Diptera) commonly  termed big-headed flies, a reference to the large (holoptic) eyes, which cover nearly the entire head. The family is found worldwide and more than 1300 species have been described.

The larvae of Pipunculidae develop as parasitoids almost exclusively in Auchenorrhyncha, the exception being the genus 
Nephrocerus, whose hosts are adult Tipulidae (crane flies). The larvae develop rapidly within the crane flies before  pupating in the soil. In all pipunculids there are only two larval stages. Some species are used as biological control agents in rice fields.

Taxonomy
Taxonomy as shown at the Tree of life, with modification based on Kehlmaier, Dierick and Skevington (2014). The name Pipunculidae is derived from the type genus Pipunculus which is thought to be derived from Latin pepo for pumpkin, thus pipunculus would mean "little pumpkin", referring to the large heads.

Subfamily Chalarinae
 Genus Chalarus Walker, 1834
 Genus Jassidophaga Aczél, 1939
 Genus Protoverrallia Aczél, 1948 Baltic amber Eocene (Priabonian)
 Genus Verrallia Mik, 1899
Subfamily Nephrocerinae
 Tribe Nephrocerini
 Genus Nephrocerus Zetterstedt, 1838
 Tribe incertae sedis
 Genus Priabona Archibald, Kehlmaier & Mathewes, 2014 Florissant Formation, Eocene (Priabonian)
Subfamily Protonephrocerinae
 Genus Protonephrocerus Collin, 1931
 Genus Metanephrocerus Carpenter & Hull, 1939 Klondike Mountain Formation,Washington, Eocene (Ypresian) Baltic amber Eocene (Priabonian) 
Subfamily Pipunculinae
 Tribe Cephalopsini
 Genus Cephalops Fallén, 1810
 Genus Cephalosphaera Enderlein, 1936
 Tribe Microcephalopsini
 Genus Collinias Aczél, 1940
 Genus Microcephalops De Meyer, 1989
 Tribe Eudorylini
 Genus Allomethus Hardy, 1943
 Genus Amazunculus Rafael, 1986
 Genus Basileunculus Rafael, 1987
 Genus Claraeola Aczél, 1940
 Genus Clistoabdominalis Skevington, 2001
 Genus Dasydorylas Skevington, 2001
 Genus Elmohardyia Rafael, 1987
 Genus Eudorylas Aczél, 1940
 Tribe Tomosvaryellini
 Genus Dorylomorpha Aczél, 1939
 Genus Tomosvaryella Aczél, 1939
 Tribe Pipunculini
 Genus Pipunculus Latreille, 1802

Gallery

See also
 List of Pipunculidae species of Great Britain

References

External links

Kehlmaier on Pipunculidae Dedicated site
Scientific paper on Pipunculidae with structural diagrams
Images at BugGuide
Gallery at Diptera.info
Family Pipunculidae at EOL Image Gallery
West Palaearctic including Russia
Nearctic
 Japan
World list

 
Brachycera families
Taxa named by Francis Walker (entomologist)